Susan Price (born 1955) is an English author of children's and young adult novels.

Susan Price is also the name of: 
 Susan Price (linguist) (born 1956), English linguist and university administrator
Susan Price (book collector) (born 1960), New Zealand writer and children's book collector

See also
Sue Price (born 1965), American professional bodybuilder and actress